Inanna is an ancient Mesopotamian goddess.

Inanna may also refer to:
 Inanna Fossa, a fossa on Pluto
 Inanna Publications, a Canadian book publisher
 Inanna Sarkis (born 1993), Canadian social media personality and actress
 Princess Inanna, a character in American adventure comedy film Year One (film)

See also
 Inana (disambiguation)